Expedition style (or "siege" style) refers to mountaineering which involves setting up a fixed line of stocked camps on the mountain which can be accessed at one's leisure, as opposed to Alpine style where one carries all of one's food, shelter, equipment etc. as one climbs. Expedition style also incorporates the use of fixed ropes, and climbers (and the porters they frequently employ) will travel up and down the route several times to fix ropes and set up camps, while Alpine style eschews fixed ropes, porters, and camps, and climbers usually only climb the route once in a continuous push. Expedition style was the type of climbing Sir Edmund Hillary and Tenzing Norgay used in the first summitting of Mount Everest.

References 

Types of climbing
Types of Mountaineering